"Lethal Weapon" is a song by American recording artist Ice-T. It was released on September 21, 1989 as a single from the rapper's third studio album The Iceberg/Freedom of Speech...Just Watch What You Say through Sire Records. The song was written and produced by Ice-T and Afrika Islam, who used a sample from Little Royal and The Swingmasters' "Razor Blade". The single peaked at number 22 in New Zealand and number 98 in the UK.

Track listing

Personnel
 Tracy Lauren Marrow – lyrics, vocals, producer, arranging
 Charles Andre Glenn – producer, programming
 Gerald "Jerry" Goldstein – producer on "Heartbeat (Remix)"
 Mark Wolfson – engineering on "Heartbeat (Remix)"
 Eric Garcia – scratches
 Bilal Bashir – editor

Chart positions

References

External links

1989 songs
1989 singles
Ice-T songs
Sire Records singles
Songs written by Ice-T
Songs written by Afrika Islam